Praet is a surname. Notable people with the surname include:

 Dennis Praet (born 1994), Belgian footballer
 Peter Praet (born 1949), Belgian economist

See also
 Pratt
 Van Praet